Cilindar is a new wave, ska, 2 Tone and reggae band from Skopje, North Macedonia formed in the early 1980s, in the then SR Macedonia.

Today its former members are respectable solo or band artists in the Macedonian music scene:

Dimitar "Mite" Dimovski -  (drums) is a drummer of Macedonian cult band Arhangel.
Petar Rendžov -  (guitar) became a prominent ethno jazz and blues guitarist as well as studio musician for other popular artists.
Risto Samardžiev -  (vocals) - after the dissolution of Cilindar in 1983 he formed the new wave and later pop-rock band Haos in Laos in 1984. In 1987 he started a successful solo career as a pop singer winning an award for best performance at the Makfest festival in the same year. Later he was also a vocalist of the popular Macedonian band Memorija. Several times he was also a candidate at the Macedonian national preselections for the Eurovision Song Contest.

The band recorded several songs and videos for the national Macedonian Radio-Television of which Samo eden del is the most popular.

After its split in the mid-1980s, the band members gathered again for a reunion concert at the Bob Marley tribute festival held in Skopje in 2008.

Trivia
The name of the band is a misspelling of the word Cylinder which means a cylinder.

See also
Haos in Laos
Music of North Macedonia
New wave music in Yugoslavia

External links
Interview with Petar Rendžov at the Macedonian Music Network 

Macedonian new wave musical groups